Finn Hill is a summit  in New York in Annsville, Oneida County, north of Taberg.

References

Mountains of Oneida County, New York
Mountains of New York (state)